
 
Cheryl Thompson is a Canadian academic known for studying the Black beauty industry and blackface in Canada. She is an Assistant Professor at Toronto Metropolitan University (formerly Ryerson University) in the School of Performance.

Thompson completed a PhD in Communication Studies at McGill University under the supervision of Charmaine Nelson and Will Straw. Her first book Beauty in a Box: Detangling the Roots of Canada's Black Beauty Culture, published in 2019 by Wilfrid Laurier Press, was based on her PhD dissertation. It examined the relationship of Black women's hair with Canadian immigration, politics, and societal norms. In a 2020 interview she explained that she wanted to raise "awareness that black women don't experience the same things other women do, and it's also based on the unique history that we have living in the Western world."

Thompson joined Toronto Metropolitan's Creative School in 2018. She is currently pursuing a research project "Newspapers, Minstrelsy and Black Performance at the Theatre: Mapping the Spaces of Nation-Building in Toronto, 1870s to 1930s" as part of a SSHRC Insight Development Grant (2019–21). Prior to her appointment at the school she was a Banting Postdoctoral Fellow from 2016-2018 with the Centre for Theatre, Drama and Performance Studies and the University of Toronto and the Department of English and Drama at the University of Toronto Mississauga .

Thompson's second book Uncle: Race, Nostalgia and the Politics of Race, which used Uncle Tom as backdrop for understanding the production of racial tropes, is set to be published 2021 by Coach House Books. The work aims to underscore the power and impact of stereotypes over time.

Select publications

Articles

Books

References

Black Canadian women
Living people
Academic staff of Toronto Metropolitan University
McGill University alumni
Year of birth missing (living people)